First Between 3rd and 4th is an EP independently released in July 2004 by singer/songwriter Joshua Radin.

Overview
The EP, his debut, features the song "Winter", a song that through Radin's friend Zach Braff found its way into an episode of Braff's television show Scrubs in early 2004; the resulting publicity prompted the EP's release. 
 
Both "Winter" and "Today" were released on Radin's 2006 full-length album We Were Here. The EP also features a cover version of "Girlfriend In A Coma", a 1987 single by The Smiths.

Track listing 
All songs written by Joshua Radin except "Girlfriend In A Coma" by Johnny Marr and Morissey
 "Winter" - 3:28
 "Girlfriend In A Coma" - 2:49
 "Don't Look Away" - 3:37
 "Today" - 3:37
 "The One You Knew" - 3:01
 "Do You Wanna" - 2:43

Personnel
Joshua Radin - Guitar, Vocals, Cover Painting
Chad Fisher - Percussion, Drums, Piano, Keyboards, Co-producer, Engineer, Mixing, Mastering
Cary Brothers - Guitar, Backing Vocals, Co-producer
Jason Kanakis - Guitar, Bass
Bonnie Somerville - Backing Vocals
John Krovosa - Cello 
Gabrielle Gewirtz - Graphics Design
Zach Braff - triangle on the song "Today", Photography

In popular culture
The song "Winter" was featured at the end of "My Screw Up", a third season episode of Scrubs.
The song "Today" was featured on "My Lucky Charm", a fourth season episode of Scrubs.
The song "Don't Look Away" was featured on "My Big Move", also a fourth season episode of Scrubs.
The song "The One You Knew" was featured on "Waiting For That Day", a first season episode of Eli Stone.

References

External links
 joshuaradin.com

Joshua Radin albums
Self-released EPs
Albums produced by Chad Fischer
2004 debut EPs